Herbert Leo Rapp (July 21, 1905 – July 21, 1983) was an American football player. He played college football for Xavier and in the National Football League (NFL) as a center for the Staten Island Stapletons (1930-1931). He appeared in 19 NFL games, nine as a starter.

References

1905 births
1983 deaths
Xavier Musketeers football players
Staten Island Stapletons players
Players of American football from Ohio